Jyme Bridges (born 22 August 1989) is an Antiguan racing cyclist, who was active from 2007 to 2018.

Major results

2007
 3rd National Road Race Championships
2008
 1st  National Road Race Championships
2009
 National Road Championships
1st  Road race
2nd Time trial
2010
 2nd National Time Trial Championships
2011
 National Road Championships
1st  Road race
1st  Under-23 Road race
2012
 National Road Championships
1st  Road race
3rd Time trial
2013
 1st  National Time Trial Championships
2014
 National Road Championships
1st  Road race
3rd Time trial
2015
 1st  National Road Race Championships
2016
 4th National Road Race Championships
2018
 National Road Championships
1st  Road race
3rd Time trial

References

1989 births
Living people
Antigua and Barbuda male cyclists
Place of birth missing (living people)